Dunnart is a common name for species of the genus Sminthopsis,  narrow-footed marsupials the size of a European mouse. They have a largely insectivorous diet.

Taxonomy 

The genus name Sminthopsis was published by Oldfield Thomas in 1887, the author noting that the name Podabrus that had previously been used to describe the species was preoccupied as a genus of beetles.
The type species is Phascogale crassicaudata, published by John Gould in 1844.

There are 19 species, all of which occur in Australia and New Guinea:

 Genus Sminthopsis 
 S. crassicaudata species-group
 Fat-tailed dunnart, Sminthopsis crassicaudata
 S. macroura species-group
 Kakadu dunnart, Sminthopsis bindi
 Carpentarian dunnart, Sminthopsis butleri
 Julia Creek dunnart, Sminthopsis douglasi
 Stripe-faced dunnart, Sminthopsis macroura
 Red-cheeked dunnart, Sminthopsis virginiae
 S. granulipes species-group
 White-tailed dunnart, Sminthopsis granulipes
 S. griseoventer species-group
 Grey-bellied dunnart, Sminthopsis griseoventer
 S. longicaudata species-group
 Long-tailed dunnart, Sminthopsis longicaudata
 S. murina species-group
 Chestnut dunnart, Sminthopsis archeri
 Little long-tailed dunnart, Sminthopsis dolichura
 Sooty dunnart, Sminthopsis fuliginosus
 Gilbert's dunnart, Sminthopsis gilberti
 White-footed dunnart, Sminthopsis leucopus
 Slender-tailed dunnart, Sminthopsis murina
 S. psammophila species-group
 Hairy-footed dunnart, Sminthopsis hirtipes
 Ooldea dunnart, Sminthopsis ooldea
 Sandhill dunnart, Sminthopsis psammophila
 Lesser hairy-footed dunnart, Sminthopsis youngsoni

The genus is referred to by their common name of dunnarts.

Description 
A male dunnart's Y chromosome is the smallest known mammalian Y chromosome.

Notes

References

External links
 Marsupial Society's checklist

Dasyuromorphs
Marsupials of Australia
Taxa named by Oldfield Thomas